is a town located in Yamanashi Prefecture, Japan. , the town had an estimated population of 26,542 in 10618 households, and a population density of 170 persons per km2.

Geography
Fujikawaguchiko is located in southern Yamanashi Prefecture, in the foothills of Mount Fuji. Three of the Fuji Five Lakes (Lake Kawaguchi, Lake Sai and Lake Shōji) are located in Fujikawaguchiko. Lake Motosu is shared with neighboring Minobu.

Neighboring municipalities
Yamanashi Prefecture:
Ōtsuki
Tsuru
Fujiyoshida
Fuefuki
Nishikatsura
Kōfu
Minobu
Narusawa

Shizuoka Prefecture:
Fujinomiya

Climate
Fujikawaguchiko features a humid continental climate (Köppen Dfa, bordering on Dfb) that closely borders on a humid subtropical climate (Köppen Cfa) and an oceanic climate (Köppen Cfb). The average annual temperature in Fujikawaguchiko is 10.3 °C. The average annual rainfall is 1663 mm with September as the wettest month.

Demographics
Per Japanese census data, the population of Fujikawaguchiko grown slightly in recent decades.

History
The area around Lake Kawaguchi has been inhabited since at least the Jōmon period. It was on the road connecting Kai Province with Suruga Province, and is mentioned in Heian period records, which also document an eruption of Mount Fuji in 864 AD.  During the Edo period, all of Kai Province was tenryō territory under direct control of the Tokugawa shogunate. During the cadastral reform of the early Meiji period on July 1, 1889, the area came under the jurisdiction of Minamitsuru District, Yamanashi Prefecture.

On 15 November 2003, the town of Kawaguchiko, and the villages of Katsuyama and Ashiwada merged to form the new town of Fujikawaguchiko. The headquarters of the infamous Aum Shinrikyo was located in the village of Kamikuishiki, most of which was absorbed into Fujikawaguchiko on 1 March 2006.

Education
Fujikawaguchiko has eight public elementary schools and two public junior high schools operated by the town government, along with one private elementary school and one private junior high school. The town has one public high school operated by the Yamanashi Prefectural Board of Education. The Health Science University, a private medical school, is located in Fujikawaguchiko.

Transportation

Railway
  Fujikyuko Line
  -.

Highway
  Chūō Expressway

Local attractions
 The toy museum of Teruhisa Kitahara
 Fuji Five Lakes
 The sound of wild birds at Lake Sai was designated as one of the 100 Soundscapes of Japan by the Ministry of the Environment

References

External links

Official Website 

 
Towns in Yamanashi Prefecture